Billy Lewis Brooks (born 1943) is an American jazz percussion player.

Brooks moved to Europe in 1964. At the beginning of 1970's, he founded the group El Babaku with the bass player  in Berlin, recording one album, Live At The Jazz Galerie, in 1971 for the MPS label.

He appeared on two albums with Fritz Pauer: Fritz Pauer-Live At The Berlin Jazz Galerie (with Jimmy Woode) and Water Plants. Other appearances and collaborations include those with the Slide Hampton/Joe Haider Orchestra, Tete Montoliu and Núria Feliu, Benny Bailey, Miriam Klein, Nathan Davis, Duško Gojković, Philip Catherine and Ximo Tebar.

References 

Born Julius E Brooks
American jazz drummers
American percussionists
American music educators
1943 births
Living people
20th-century American drummers
American male drummers
20th-century American male musicians
American male jazz musicians